Gümüş is the Turkic word for "silver." It may refer to:

 Gümüş (TV series), a Turkish soap opera
 Emine Gümüş (born 1992), Turkish women's footballer
 Esra Gümüş (born 1982), Turkish female volleyball player
 Ferit Gümüş (born 1981), Turkish wheelchair basketball player and Paralympian
 Sinan Gümüş (born 1994), Turkish-German footballer
 Ali Gümüş (1940-2015), legendary Turkish sports journalist and the president of the World Wrestling Journalists Association (AIPS)
 Zeynep Hülya Gümüş, Assistant Professor of Genetics and Genomics at * Icahn School of Medicine at Mount Sinai in * New York City
 Gümüş, Acıpayam

See also
 Gümüşdamla (disambiguation)
 Gümüşdere (disambiguation)
 Gümüşgöze (disambiguation)
 Gümüşhane (disambiguation)
 Gümüşlü (disambiguation)
 Gümüşler (disambiguation)
 Gümüşkavak (disambiguation)
 Gümüşköy (disambiguation)
 Gümüşsu (disambiguation)
 Gümüşyaka (disambiguation)